In cosmology, the relic abundance of a given elementary particle is a measure of the present quantity of that particle remaining from the Big Bang.

Uses
Relic abundance is modelled for WIMPs (weakly interacting massive particles) in the study of dark matter.

Calculation
Assuming that an elementary particle was formerly in thermal equilibrium, its relic abundance may be calculated using a Boltzmann equation.

The temperature scaled abundance of a particle is defined by

where  is the number density:

that is, number of particles per physical volume (not the comoving volume).

The relic abundance of a particle is shown by  indicates the asymptotic value of abundance of a species of a particle which it will reach after its "freeze-out".

References

Physical cosmology